The 1991 European Indoor Championships was an ATP tennis tournament held in Berlin, Germany. The tournament was played on indoor carpet and was held from October 7 to October 14.

Petr Korda won his eighth career title and his fourth of the year by defeating Arnaud Boetsch in the final.

Finals

Singles

 Petr Korda defeated  Arnaud Boetsch, 6–3, 6–4

Doubles

 Petr Korda /  Karel Nováček defeated  Jan Siemerink /  Daniel Vacek, 3–6, 7–5, 7–5

References

External links
 ITF tournament edition details

Berlin